Greatest Hits is the first greatest hits album by American country music artist Craig Morgan. It was released on September 30, 2008, by Broken Bow Records. No new material was recorded for the project since Morgan left Broken Bow earlier in the year. "I Love It", "I'm Country", and "I Am" were never released as singles.

Track listing

Charts

Weekly charts

Year-end charts

References

[ Greatest Hits] at Allmusic

2008 greatest hits albums
Craig Morgan albums
BBR Music Group compilation albums